Ralph Ramsey may refer to:

Ralph Ramsey (MP) (died 1419), for Suffolk and Great Yarmouth
Ralph Ramsey (character), see Lucy Ricardo